Lawrence Gene Fullmer (July 21, 1931 – April 27, 2015) was an American professional boxer and World Middleweight champion.

Professional career

Fullmer began his professional career in 1951 and won his first 29 fights, 19 by knockout. His manager during many years of his career was his mentor, Marv Jenson, who encouraged many youth in West Jordan, Utah, to enter boxing as amateurs.

Middleweight champion
Fullmer won the world middleweight championship on January 2, 1957, when he upset the legendary Sugar Ray Robinson by soundly winning a unanimous 15-round decision.  On May 1, 1957 they fought a rematch. The fight began as expected, with Fullmer using his strength and awkwardness to bull into Robinson and really force him onto his heels. In the fifth round Robinson, while backing up, lashed out with what has been called the perfect left hook. It caught Fullmer flush on the chin and knocked him out.

In 1959, the National Boxing Association withdrew its recognition of Robinson as middleweight champion. Fullmer and fellow former middleweight champion Carmen Basilio fought for the vacant NBA title on August 28, 1959, and Fullmer won the crown when he TKOed Basilio in the 14th round. Meanwhile, Robinson was to lose his version of the middleweight championship to Paul Pender.

Fullmer and Pender never met to settle their claims to the middleweight title, and Pender eventually retired. Meanwhile, Fullmer fought and turned back the challenges of many top contenders, such as Basilio, Ellsworth "Spider" Webb, Florentino Fernández, and welterweight champion Benny "Kid" Paret. He narrowly escaped being dethroned when he was held to 15-round draws by Robinson and future titleholder Joey Giardello. The draw against Robinson was widely criticised by almost every ringside observer, who had Robinson winning 11-4 or 10-5 in rounds.  In their final meeting, a title bout in 1961, Fullmer beat Robinson by unanimous decision.

Losing the title
Fullmer finally lost the middleweight title to Dick Tiger on October 23, 1962 in a unanimous decision. They fought a rematch on February 23, 1963, which resulted in a draw. Fullmer's attempts to regain the middleweight crown finally ended when he was TKOed in seven rounds by Tiger on August 10, 1963.

Fullmer's final record included 55 wins (24 by KO), 6 losses, and 3 draws.

Professional boxing record

Personal life

Fullmer graduated from Jordan High School and worked at Kennecott Copper Mine for several years, he also served in the Korean War. He married Dolores Holt on October 13, 1955 in the Salt Lake Temple. They raised 2 daughters and 2 sons.

Fullmer had two younger brothers who boxed: Don Fullmer (February 21, 1939 - January 28, 2012), who twice challenged for the World Middleweight Title, and Jay Fullmer (March 9, 1937 - April 22, 2015), who boxed as a lightweight.

Fullmer was a member of the Church of Jesus Christ of Latter-day Saints (LDS Church), and his living the tenets of his religion, especially the Word of Wisdom, was heavily covered in the press. It was also frequently mentioned that he was a father and that he paid tithing on his boxing winnings.

Fullmer appeared in a cameo role in the 1968 film The Devil's Brigade as a Montana bartender.

Fullmer is featured on the cover of the album Greatest Hits by Alice in Chains.

On January 21, 1962, Fullmer appeared on What's My Line? but not as a mystery guest. His line was that he was a mink rancher.

His fight with Dick Tiger appears prominently in the music video for the Iggy Pop song 'American Valhalla'.

On April 27, 2015, five days after younger brother Jay's death, Gene died at the age of 83 in his home surrounded by friends and family.

Filmography
The Devil's Brigade (1968) - The Bartender

See also
List of middleweight boxing champions

References

External links 
 History of Gene Fullmer and Marvin Jensen, West Jordan History Pages
 Biography and Fight-by-Fight Record, International Boxing Hall of Fame
 Fullmer Brothers Boxing website
 Photograph of Fullmer
 

1931 births
2015 deaths
Middleweight boxers
International Boxing Hall of Fame inductees
Boxers from Utah
People from West Jordan, Utah
Latter Day Saints from Utah
American male boxers